Wenshan may refer to:
 
 Wenshan Zhuang and Miao Autonomous Prefecture (文山壮族苗族自治州), Yunnan, PR China
 Wenshan City (文山市), the seat of the Wenshan Zhuang and Miao Autonomous Prefecture
 Wenshan District (文山區), Taipei, Republic of China (Taiwan)
 Wenshan Line (Taipei Metro), railway line of Taipei Metro, Taiwan
 Wenshan (mountain), Annamite Range, Indochina; see List of Ultras of Southeast Asia